Prince Józef Mikołaj Radziwiłł  (1736–1813) was a Polish–Lithuanian noble (szlachcic).

The 8th Ordynat of Kleck, Grand Clerk of Lithuania since 1764, voivode of Minsk Voivodeship since 1773, castellan of Trakai since 1784, voivode of Trakai Voivodeship since 1788 and Knight of Malta.

Knight of the Order of the White Eagle, awarded in 1777.

Secular senators of the Polish–Lithuanian Commonwealth
1736 births
1813 deaths
Jozef Mikolaj Radziwill
Voivodes of Trakai
Voivodes of Minsk